The 2010 European Baseball Championship was an international baseball competition held in Germany from July 23 to August 1, 2010. The tournament was originally set to be held in 2009 with Russia as host. In March 2008, the Confederation of European Baseball awarded the tournament to the German Baseball and Softball Federation. The event was hosted by the cities of Stuttgart, Heidenheim an der Brenz and Neuenburg am Rhein in the southwest of Germany.

Qualification

The following 12 teams qualified for the 2010 European Baseball Championships.

Round 1

Pool A

Standings

Source: www.baseballstats.eu

All times are local (UTC+2)

Schedule

Source: www.baseballstats.eu

Pool B

Standings

Source: www.baseballstats.eu

All times are local (UTC+2)

Schedule

Source: www.baseballstats.eu

Classification games

11th place game

9th place game

7th place game

Source: www.baseballstats.eu

Round 2

Pool C

Standings

Source: www.baseballstats.eu

All times are local (UTC+2)

Schedule

Source: www.baseballstats.eu

Final

Source: www.baseballstats.eu

Final standings

Source: www.baseballstats.eu

External links
Official Website
Schedule of the tournament

References

2010
European Baseball Championship
2010
2010 in German sport